Emmet O'Neal (April 14, 1887 – July 18, 1967) was a U.S. Representative from Kentucky and an ambassador to the Philippines. A member of the Centre College Athletic Hall of Fame, his brother was Louisville Mayor Joseph T. O'Neal.

O'Neal was born in Louisville to Joseph T. O'Neal, Sr. and Lydia Elizabeth (Wright). O'Neal was the youngest of four children in his family and he graduated from Centre College in Danville, Kentucky in 1907. During his tenure at Centre College, he participated in football, basketball, baseball, and tennis in which he won a championship title. In 1906–07, he led the football, basketball and baseball squad. He kicked one drop kick for 48 yards. O'Neal would be inducted into the Centre College Athletic Hall of Fame in 2006. O'Neal graduated from Yale University in 1908 and from the law department of the University of Louisville in 1910. He was following his father and brothers' footsteps as they were all lawyers.

O'Neal was admitted to the bar in 1910 and started his law practice in Louisville. During World War I, O'Neal served overseas in the United States Army. O'Neal was enlisted in the Fifth Field Artillery in the First Division and as an officer in the One Hundred and Third Field Artillery in the Twenty-sixth Division from 1917 to 1919. Following the war he resumed the practice of law in Louisville and later became involved in banking.

O'Neal went into politics being elected as a Democrat to the Seventy-fourth Congress from Kentucky's 3rd District and to the five succeeding Congresses (January 3, 1935 - January 3, 1947). He was an unsuccessful candidate for reelection in 1946 to the Eightieth Congress losing to Thruston Ballard Morton. The following year, he served as an ambassador to the Philippines from September 22, 1947 to April 28, 1948.

After serving as an ambassador O'Neal resumed the practice of law in Washington, D.C. He became active in the Corregidor-Bataan Memorial Commission and would eventually become a chairman for the commission. O'Neal died in Washington and was interred in Cave Hill Cemetery in Louisville.

See also
Joseph T. O'Neal

References

1887 births
1967 deaths
Politicians from Louisville, Kentucky
United States Army officers
Democratic Party members of the United States House of Representatives from Kentucky
University of Louisville School of Law alumni
Yale University alumni
Ambassadors of the United States to the Philippines
Baseball players from Louisville, Kentucky
Players of American football from Louisville, Kentucky
American athlete-politicians
American football drop kickers
Centre Colonels football players
Centre Colonels baseball players
20th-century American politicians
20th-century American diplomats
Burials at Cave Hill Cemetery